Matty Dawson-Jones is an English rugby league footballer who plays as a er or  for Sheffield Eagles in the Betfred Championship.

He has previously played for the Huddersfield Giants in the Super League, spending time on loan from Huddersfield at Doncaster in the Championship. He played for St Helens, and spent time on loan from the Saints at the Rochdale Hornets in the Championship. He also played for the Leigh Centurions in the Super League and Betfred Championship.

Background
Matthew Dawson was born in Pontefract, West Yorkshire, England.

Career
Dawson, a Castleford Tigers player at youth level, made his senior début in the Super League with the Huddersfield Giants. Whilst at Huddersfield, Dawson also played for Doncaster on loan in the Championship, before signing for St. Helens, and making 50 appearances.

He has played for the Leigh Centurions in the Betfred Championship, and has played a few times for the Rochdale Hornets on dual registration.

In 2018, Dawson-Jones signed a contract with Hull F.C. which will see him play with the club from 2019.

In January 2020, Dawson-Jones signed a one-year deal with RFL Championship side Bradford Bulls. Following the cancelled season he took up the option of an extra year to stay for the 2021 season.

References

External links 
Hull FC profile
Leigh Centurions profile
Leigh profile
St Helens profile
SL profile

1990 births
Living people
Bradford Bulls players
Doncaster R.L.F.C. players
English rugby league players
Huddersfield Giants players
Hull F.C. players
Leigh Leopards players
Rochdale Hornets players
Rugby league centres
Rugby league players from Pontefract
Rugby league wingers
Sheffield Eagles players
St Helens R.F.C. players